Egesina elegans is a species of longhorn beetles of the subfamily Lamiinae.

References

External links

 Egesina elegans at Biolib.cz
 Egesina elegans at insecta.pro

Egesina
Beetles described in 1925